Claudio Escauriza (born 3 May 1958 in Paraguay) is a Paraguayan athletics coach and former decathlete, who competed at the 1984 Summer Olympics in Los Angeles, United States of America and the 1st IAAF World Championships in 1983 in Helsinki, Finland. Escauriza represented Paraguay at several South American Championships, and also holds the Paraguayan national record in decathlon with a score of 6,943. He was the coach of Paraguayan Javelin Thrower Fabian Jara. Escauriza is the father of Paraguayan tennis player Lara Escauriza.

Trajectory
Escuariza finished 2nd at the 1982 Southern Cross Games in Argentina.

Coaching
Escauriza and Édgar Torres both attended the 2012 Summer Olympics as coaches of the group.

At the 2013 South American Championships in Cartagena, Colombia, Escauriza was part of the coaching body with Plinio Penzzi and Hungarian Thomas Zuddy.

Personal life
In 2009, Escauriza, along with José Luis Chilavert, Tomás Orué and lawyer Alejandro Rubin, attended a Press Conference at Asunción Shopping Centre Shopping del Sol, in support Edgar Baumann, who had received a favorable ruling from the Paraguay Supreme Court in a case against the Paraguay Olympic Committee president Ramón Zubizarreta for robbing him the right of competing at the 2000 Summer Olympics and also taking his sums of money that he earned from his scholarship.

See also
 Decathlon
 List of Paraguayan records in athletics

References

External links
 
 
 

1958 births
Living people
Paraguayan decathletes
Athletes (track and field) at the 1984 Summer Olympics
Olympic athletes of Paraguay
Competitors at the 1982 Southern Cross Games
World Athletics Championships athletes for Paraguay